Love My Dog is a 1927 American short silent comedy film directed by Robert F. McGowan. It was the 59th Our Gang short subject released. It was remade in 1932 as The Pooch.

Plot
After Farina and Joe's dog Oleander is taken to the pound, the kids have to raise enough money to rescue him.

Cast

The Gang
 Joe Cobb - Joe
 Jackie Condon - Jackie
 Allen Hoskins - Farina
 Scooter Lowry - Skooter
 Jay R. Smith - Jay
 Bobby Young - Bonedust

Additional cast
 Mildred Kornman - Baby on the ledge
 Bobby Mallon - Kid warning the gang
 Andy Shuford as Kid at dog show
 Dick Gilbert - Attendant at gas station
 Charles McMurphy - Dog catcher
 Tiny Sandford - P. Fulton, attorney at law
 Charley Young - Office worker

See also
 Our Gang filmography

References

External links

1927 films
1927 short films
American silent short films
American black-and-white films
1927 comedy films
Films directed by Robert F. McGowan
Hal Roach Studios short films
Our Gang films
Films about dogs
1920s American films
Silent American comedy films
1920s English-language films